The Kingsburg Recorder is a weekly paper covering Kingsburg, CA and the surrounding communities of Fresno County, California. The paper is owned by Lee Central California Newspapers which, in 2015, combined the Kingburg Reporter with the Selma Enterprise, consolidating printing operations at the Santa Maria Times printing location.

The Recorder/Enterprise is edited by Jenny McGill.

History 
Founded in 1904 by P.F. Adelsbach, by 1907 the Recorder was a ten-page weekly published on Wednesdays. P.F. Adelsbach  helped to found the Central California Press Association and served as its first secretary-treasurer. Adelsbach was also proprietor and editor of the Selma Enterprise. Adelsbach was sometimes known by the name Percy Adams.

Tragedy struck the paper in 1911, when a young printer, Harrison Teas shot himself in the head at the Kingsburg Recorder's office. P.F. Adelsbach's wife found the body the following day. The apparent suicide was seen as unexpected, as the young man had not reportedly shown signs of despondence. A year later, printer Fred Anderson had his finger cut off while printing the paper.

B.W. McKeen became owner of the Kingsburg Recorder in 1912. In 1928, B.W. McKeen sold the paper to F.I. Drexler.

In 1951, Edwin E. Jacobs Jr. sold the Recorder to Roy Brock. In 1984, Roy Brock, publisher of the Recorder and Selma Enterprise won the Justus F. Craemer Newspaper Executive of the Year Award from the California Press Foundation. Roy's son, James Brock, who was also a publisher of the Recorder won the same award in 1999.

James Brock sold the Recorder and Selma Enterprise in 2000 to Pulitzer, Inc., along with a free advertiser, the South County News.

The paper became part of Lee Central California Newspapers in 2013, part of Lee Enterprises, along with Hanford Sentinel, Lemoore Navy News, Kingsburg Recorder, and Santa Maria Times. Lee Central decided to combine the Selma Enterprise with the Kingsburg Recorder in July 2015, consolidating printing operations at the Santa Maria Times printing location.

Awards

California Newspaper Publishers Association Better Newspaper Contest 

2016 George F. Gruner Prizes for Meritorious Public Service

References

Weekly newspapers published in California
Publications established in 1904
Mass media in Fresno County, California
1904 establishments in California